Digera is a genus of flowering plants belonging to the family Amaranthaceae.

Its native range is Northeastern and Eastern Tropical Africa to Malesia.

Species:
 Digera muricata (L.) Mart.

References

Amaranthaceae
Amaranthaceae genera